Eisenstadt (or) is a city in Austria, the state capital of Burgenland. It had a recorded population on 29 April 2021 of 15,074.

In the Habsburg Empire's Kingdom of Hungary, Kismarton (Eisenstadt) was the seat of the Eszterházy Hungarian noble family. The composer Joseph Haydn lived there as Hofkapellmeister under Esterházy patronage.

Geography 

It is the 38st largest city in Austria.

Subdivisions 
Eisenstadt is divided into three districts (Stadtbezirke):
Eisenstadt-Stadt
 Kleinhöflein im Burgenland – a town that lies to the west of Eisenstadt proper
 St. Georgen am Leithagebirge (Lajtaszentgyörgy; Svetojurje) – a town that lies to the east of Eisenstadt proper

The city is divided into five Katastralgemeinden:
 Eisenstadt-Stadt
 Oberberg, or Oberberg-Eisenstadt – the northern area of Eisenstadt from the Jewish quarter, Jewish cemetery
 Unterberg, or Unterberg-Eisenstadt (Alsókismartonhegy; Željezno Donji Brig) – the southern area of Eisenstadt from Kalvarienbergplatz, Ruster Strasse
 Kleinhöflein im Burgenland
 St. Georgen am Leithagebirge

Other informal areas of the city include Wiesäcker and Lobäcker, which lie south of the Eisbach, a tributary of the Wulka.  The city is surrounded by the district (Bezirk) of Eisenstadt-Umgebung.

The city previously included the districts (Ortsteile) of Eisenstadt-Stadt, Eisenstadt-Oberberg, Eisenstadt-Unterberg, and Eisenstadt-Schloßgrund (Kismartonváralja).

Nearby municipalities 
 Großhöflein, Müllendorf, Steinbrunn, Neufeld/Leitha and Ebenfurth
 Hornstein
 Wulkaprodersdorf, Trausdorf/Wulka (on the Wulka and Eisbach)

Climate

Names and etymology

The city's name means "Iron City" and was first recorded in 1118 as Castrum ferrum, referring to the history of iron mining and iron trade in the area. The first written mention of the town is from 1264 as "minor Mortin", matching the Hungarian name, Kismarton, which recalls Martin of Tours, the patron saint of the main church.

History 
Archeological finds prove that the Eisenstadt area was already settled in the Hallstatt period. Celts and Romans settled somewhat later. During the Migration Period, the area was settled by different Germanic tribes and the Huns. Around 800, during the reign of Charlemagne, settlement by the Bavarii began. The territory became part of the Kingdom of Hungary in the 11th century.

The fortress built on the original earth works was destroyed by the troops of Margrave Leopold III of Austria. In 1241, it was destroyed by the Mongol invaders. In 1373, the town came into the possession of the Kanizsai family, who rebuilt the walls surrounding the town and built a fortress at the site of the present day castle between 1388 and 1392. In 1388, Eisenstadt was given the right to hold markets by Emperor Sigismund.

From 1440 Archduke Albert VI of Austria held the town as collateral for a loan. In 1451, Matthias Corvinus ceded it to Frederick III, Holy Roman Emperor in return for the Holy Crown of Hungary. Matthias Corvinus reconquered it by force in 1482, but Maximilian I acquired it again in 1490. It remained under Habsburg rule until 1622; however, the Ottoman Empire briefly conquered Kismarton in 1529 and 1532 during their advances on the city of Vienna (see Ottoman wars in Europe). It was destroyed by fire in 1589.

In 1648, it passed under the rule of the Esterházy family. These Hungarian princes permanently changed the face of the city due to their extensive construction, especially on their castle, Schloss Esterházy. During this period, the city was captured by the army of Imre Thököly in 1683, and it saw the defeat of the rebel kuruc army of Sándor Károlyi by the Habsburgs in 1704. It was again destroyed by fire in 1776.

The appointment of Joseph Haydn as the prince's Hofkapellmeister (court orchestra director, composing and performing music) began the great artistic period in the city's history. In 1809, Eisenstadt was occupied by French troops during the Napoleonic Wars; in 1897, it was joined to the railway network.

Until the end of World War I, it was the seat of Kismarton district in Sopron county in the Kingdom of Hungary. Without plebiscite, the city and the entire Hungarian territory of Burgenland (with the exception of the city of Sopron and 11 other villages in which referendums were held) was annexed to Austria by the Saint-Germain and Treaties of Trianon in 1921. Since 30 April 1925, Eisenstadt has been the seat of the Burgenland state government and thus the state capital. During World War II, Eisenstadt was heavily bombarded. On 2 April 1945, it was captured by Soviet troops of the 3rd Ukrainian Front in the course of the Vienna Offensive, and the city remained under Soviet occupation until 1955. In 1960, Eisenstadt became the see of its own Roman Catholic diocese.

Politics 
The current mayor of Eisenstadt is Mag. Thomas Steiner ÖVP.

The district council is composed as follows:
 Austrian People's Party (ÖVP): 17 seats
 Social Democratic Party of Austria (SPÖ): 8 seats
 Austrian Green Party (Die Grünen): 2 seats
 Freedom Party of Austria (FPÖ): 2 seats

The total annual city budget of Eisenstadt in 2021 is €42.256.600 with total expenditure of €42.255.800.

Main sights

Castles and palaces 
 Schloss Esterházy and Schlosspark, the Esterházy castle and park.
 Orangerie
 Gloriette, the former Esterházy hunting lodge.

Religious edifices 

 Bergkirche, housing Haydn's tomb
 Eisenstadt Cathedral, late Gothic former military church, began in 1460
 Franziskanerkirche (Franciscan church), built in 1629, it contains the crypt of the Esterházy family
 Jewish quarter
 Jewish Community of Eisenstadt (1732–1938, 1945–)
 A private synagogue Österreichisches Jüdisches Museum, formerly Samson Wertheimer's house
Jewish cemetery of Eisenstadt

Buildings 
 Haydn-Mausoleum
 Rathaus (City Hall)
 Pulverturm (lit. "Powder tower")

Museums 
 Haydnmuseum, a museum dedicated to Joseph Haydn, who lived in the building between 1766 and 1778.
 Landesmuseum (regional museum).
 Österreichisches Jüdisches Museum (Austrian Jewish Museum).
 Diözesanmuseum (museum of the local Roman Catholic diocese).
 Feuerwehrmuseum (fire department museum).

Gallery

Culture 
Eisenstadt hosts a Haydn festival, the Haydnfestspiele.

Twin towns — sister cities

Eisenstadt is twinned with:
 Bad Kissingen, Bavaria, Germany
 Colmar, Haut-Rhin, Grand Est, France
 Manassas, United States
 Lignano Sabbiadoro, Udine, Friuli-Venezia Giulia, Italy
 Sanuki, Japan
 Raleigh, United States
 Sopron, Hungary

Notable people

Natives 

 Moritz Benedikt (1835–1920) neurologist
 Isaiah Berlin (1725–1799) rabbi
 Stefan Billes (1909, Kleinhöflein – 2002) politician
 Friedrich Bridgetower (1782-1813) composer, cellist, brother of George Bridgetower
 Akiva Eiger (1761–1837) rabbi and champion of Orthodox Judaism
 Paul I, 1st Prince Esterházy of Galántha (1635–1713)
 Prince Paul II Anton Esterházy (1711–1762) soldier and patron of music
 Gyula Farkas (1894–1958) linguist
 Andrea Fraunschiel (1955–2019) mayor
 Josef Hyrtl (1810–1894) anatomist
 Josef Kirchknopf (1930, Kleinhöflein – ), politician
 Johann Luif (1959, Kleinhöflein – ), BG, Commander Provincial Military Headquarters Burgenland
 Maria Perschy (1938–2004, Vienna) actress
 Rudolf Simek (1954– ) Germanist and Philologian.
 Martin Vukovich (1944 – ) diplomat
 Joseph Franz Weigl (1740–1820) cellist
 Joseph Weigl (1766–1846) composer and conductor
 Anton Pauschenwein (1981 – ) football player
 Thomas Mandl (1979 – ) football player
 Michael Mörz (1980 – ) football player
 Johann Dihanich (1958 – ) football player

Other residents 

 Samuel Löw Brill (1814–1897), rabbi and Talmudical scholar; born in Budapest; attended yeshiva
 Meir Eisenstadt (1670–1744) rabbi of the Siebengemeinden
 Joseph Haydn (1732–1809), musician, born in Rohrau
 Azriel Hildesheimer (1820–1899), German rabbi, founder of Torah im Derech Eretz; in 1851, he was called to the rabbinate of Eisenstadt
 Markus Horovitz (1844–1915), German rabbi and historian; born March 14, 1844, in Tiszaladány, Hungary, pursued his rabbinical studies at the yeshiva
 Johann Nepomuk Hummel (1778–1837), musician
 Paul Iby (born 1935), a reformist Roman Catholic bishop
 Adam Liszt (1776–1827), musician, father of Franz Liszt
 Leopold Löw (1811–1875), born in Černá Hora, Moravia, studied at the yeshiva of Eisenstadt
 Mordecai Mokiach (ca. 1650–1724), "pseudo"-Messiah, born in Alsace
 Robert Musil (1880–1942), author
 Ignaz Pleyel (1757–1831), composer
 Emanuel Schreiber (1852–1932), rabbi
 Fritz Spiegl (1926–2003) musician, journalist, broadcaster, humorist and collector
 Isaac Hirsch Weiss (1815–1905), talmudist and historian of literature; born at Velké Meziříčí, Moravia; studied at yeshiva
 Samson Wertheimer (1658–1724), rabbi
 Aaron Wise (1844–1896), rabbi, born in Eger, Hungary, studied at yeshiva; the father of Stephen Samuel Wise

As a surname 

Eisenstadt (also Ajzenstat, Eisenstaedter, Asch, etc.), a Jewish surname, derives from this city. Some people with this surname or its variants include:
 Alfred Eisenstaedt
 Meir Eisenstadt
 Shmuel Eisenstadt Israeli sociologist
 Stuart E. Eizenstat
 Moses Asch

References

External links 

 Official website 
 Official Eisenstadt Tourism Site
 Eisenstadt on the official Burgenland site 
 Österreichisches Jüdisches Museum (Austrian Jewish Museum) 
 Jewish Encyclopedia article on the Jewish community of Eisenstadt 
 Schloss Esterházy (Esterházy Castle) 
 Haydn festival 
 Fachhochschul-Studiengänge Burgenland University of applied sciences. 
 "Iron City", Eisenstadt page for young adult activities. 
 Eisenstadt in English 

 
Austrian state capitals
Districts of Burgenland
Cities and towns in Burgenland
Esterházy family
Siebengemeinden
Eisenstadt-Umgebung District